Kwafie Festival is an annual festival celebrated by the chiefs and people of Wenchi in the Bono region and Techiman and in the Bono East Region, which were all formally Brong Ahafo region of Ghana. It is usually celebrated in the month of July. The people of Dormaa, Berekum and Nsoatre also celebrate it in November/ December.

Celebrations 
During the festival, visitors are welcomed to share food and drinks. The people put on traditional clothes and there is durbar of chiefs. There is also dancing and drumming.
The Kwafie Festival is celebrated in Dormaa Ahenkro, Berekum, and Nsuatre in the Brong Ahafo Region of Ghana to commemorate the bringing of fire to the area, said to have been accomplished by ancestors who emigrated to this region long ago. The celebration lasts about three days and can occur in either November, December, or January. In Dormaa Ahenkro the festival begins with an evening torchlight procession from the palace to the house where the sacred stools are kept. The ancestors are worshipped with libations, then the procession returns to the palace. The next morning everyone gathers at the palace where the chief presides over the "laying of logs," or Nkukuato, in which lower-level officials bring in logs on their shoulders to give the chief. The highest ranking official chooses three logs to begin the fire, which is then used for cooking a ritual meal.
Later in the day an even grander procession carries the ancestral stools to a nearby body of water for ritual purification. Other sacred ceremonies are also performed. Then the final day of the festival is marked by joyous dancing, music, and feasts on the palace grounds.

Significance 
This festival is celebrated to mark an event that took place in the past. The Dormaas are burn a large bonfire during the festival by claiming they brought fire to Ghana.

References 

Festivals in Ghana
Bono Region
Bono East Region